The Shire of Pyalong was a local government area about  north of Melbourne, the state capital of Victoria, Australia.

History

Pyalong was incorporated as a road district on 2 September 1863, and became a shire on 5 May 1871.

On 18 November 1994, the Shire of Pyalong was abolished, and along with the Rural City of Seymour, the Shire of Broadford and parts of the Shire of McIvor, was merged into the newly created Shire of Mitchell.

Wards

The Shire of Pyalong was divided into three ridings, each of which elected three councillors:
 East Riding
 South Riding
 West Riding

Towns and localities
 Glenaroua
 Moranding
 Puckapunyal
 Pyalong*
 Sugarloaf Creek

* Council seat.

Population

* Estimate in the 1958 Victorian Year Book.

References

External links
 Victorian Places - Pyalong

Pyalong